Hopea pterygota is a tree in the family Dipterocarpaceae, native to Borneo. The specific epithet pterygota means "winged", referring to the fruit.

Description
The bark is smooth.

Distribution and habitat
Hopea pterygota is endemic to Borneo.

References

pterygota
Endemic flora of Borneo
Plants described in 1967
Taxonomy articles created by Polbot